Ballando con le Stelle is the Italian version of the Strictly Come Dancing / Dancing with the Stars franchises.

It was first broadcast on 8 January 2005 on TV station RAI 1. This show is aired in the prime time, usually of saturday evening, and is hosted by Milly Carlucci with Paolo Belli and his orchestra: this is the most important and successful program of RAI.

Overview

References

External links
Official website of Ballando con le Stelle 

 
2005 Italian television series debuts
RAI original programming